Eilidh MacQueen (born 20 May 1986 in Troon, Scotland) is a Thailand-based Scottish actress.

Early career 

Eilidh Kate MacQueen was born in Scotland and lived in New Zealand, Australia, Scotland, Dubai and Thailand, before settling in Bangkok, Thailand with her partner, actor and Thai pop star Louis Scott. Her early career involved a litany of modelling jobs, including FHM Thailand in which she was voted 25th sexiest female in the world, catwalk for La Perla, Yves Saint Lauren, Lanvin and Chanel, catalogue work for Motorola, Samsung, Christian Dior, commercials for Panasonic and Toyota and videos for Thai music acts Joey Boy and 'Jiwa'.

Film 

MacQueen has been involved in four feature films to date, playing supporting roles, notably in Belly of the Beast, a film starring Steven Seagal.

External links 

1986 births
Scottish film actresses
Scottish female models
Living people
Scottish expatriates in the United Arab Emirates